Parashakti (IAST: Paraśakti, Sanskrit: पराशक्ति) or Parā is one of the three chief goddesses in Trika system of Kashmir Shaivism along with Aparā and Parparā. In Siddhantic perspective, Parashakti is the counterpart of Paramshiva. Paramshiva is used to describe the ultimate form of Shiva. Parashakti is the power of this primordial Shiva, who is emanated by Paramshiva. Adi Parashakti is used to describe the ultimate form of Parvati.  Parashakti is an all-pervasive, pure consciousness, power, and primal substance of all that exists and it has Mahamaya-form, unlike Parashiva which is formless. A Parashakti as the supreme being of puranic Shaktism and of Sri Vidya obtained the name Adi Parashakti and Maheshvari-Devi.

Parā  in Trika 

Trika is a Non-Saiddhantic Mantra Margic Saivite sect praising Parā, Aparā  and Parāparā as three supreme goddesses. These three represent the three prongs of Shiva's Trishula and they can be meditated in Trishulabja Mandala. The three aspects are emerging from Kulesvari Matrrusadbhava. Para means the highest form and beyond the range of human understanding while it loses its supremacy and manifests Parapara, the mediocre level. While it further loses its strength it becomes Apara. These three aspects symbolizes Shiva, Shakti and Atman in philosophical perspective of Trika.

Para in Siddhanta 

According to Saiva Siddhanta, the lower part (pedestal) of Shiva lingam represents parashakti while upper part (oval stone) represents parashiva.

Para in Shaktism

See also 
 Paramashiva
 Trika
 Adi parashakti

References

Forms of Shiva
Kashmir Shaivism
Shaktism